Morawski (feminine: Morawska; plural: Morawscy) is a Polish surname. It is related to a number of surnames in other languages.

Related surnames

People

Morawski/Morawska
 Adam Morawski (born 1994), Polish handball player
 Cezary Morawski (born 1954), Polish actor
 Edward Osóbka-Morawski (1909–1997), Polish politician
 Feliks Jan Szczęsny Morawski (1818–1898), Polish historian and painter
 Franciszek Morawski (1783–1861), Polish general
 Gabriela Morawska-Stanecka (born 1968), Polish politician
 Jan Morawski (1633–1700), Polish Jesuit and theological writer
 Kalikst Morawski (1859–1939), Polish chess master
 Kazimierz Morawski (philologist) (1852–1925), Polish philologist and historian
 Konrad Morawski (1913–1985), Polish actor
 Lidia Morawska, Polish-born Australian aerosol physicist
 Piotr Morawski (1976–2009), Polish mountaineer
 Ryszard Morawski (born 1933), Polish painter
 Seweryn Morawski (1819–1900), Polish Catholic bishop
 Witold Dzierżykraj-Morawski (1895–1944), Polish military commander

Other forms
 Gustav Pfleger Moravský (1833–1875), Czech author
 Joe Moravsky, American game show contestant
 Maria Moravskaya (1890–1947), Russian writer

See also
 
 
 

Polish-language surnames
Polish toponymic surnames
Ethnonymic surnames